South Africa competed at the 2016 Summer Olympics in Rio de Janeiro, from 5 to 21 August 2016. This was the nation's seventh consecutive appearance at the Games in the post-apartheid era, and nineteenth overall in Summer Olympic history. The South African Sports Confederation and Olympic Committee (SASCOC) sent the nation's largest ever delegation to the Olympics, with a total of 138 athletes, 93 men and 45 women, competing across 15 sports.

South Africa left Rio de Janeiro with a total of 10 medals (2 gold, 6 silver, and 2 bronze), marking the nation's most successful Olympics since its readmission in 1992. Moreover, it attained the potential medal target set by SASCOC for the Games. Four of these medals were awarded to the track and field athletes, including two golds won respectively by runners Caster Semenya and Wayde van Niekerk, who broke the 16-year-old world record in the men's 400 metres. South Africa also proved particularly successful in team sports, as the rugby sevens squad, popularly known by locals as Blitzboks, scored a historic bronze over Japan in the men's tournament.

Among the medalists were Luvo Manyonga, who overcame drug addiction to achieve a runner-up finish in the men's long jump, cancer survivor Lawrence Brittain, who picked up a silver alongside his veteran partner Shaun Keeling in the men's rowing pair, and Henri Schoeman, who surprised the field by securing South Africa's first ever triathlon medal with a bronze in the men's race. Swimmers Cameron van der Burgh and Chad le Clos contributed three of the country's silver medals in the pool, with le Clos emerging as South Africa's most decorated Olympian of all-time at four medals (one gold and three silver) over two Games. Meanwhile, Sunette Viljoen rebounded from a disappointing 2012 result to ascend the Olympic podium at her fourth Games, earning a silver in the women's javelin throw.

Medalists

|  style="text-align:left; width:78%; vertical-align:top;"|

|  style="text-align:left; width:22%; vertical-align:top;"|

Competitors
South African Sports Confederation and Olympic Committee (SASCOC) confirmed a team of 138 athletes, 93 men and 45 women, to compete across 15 sports at the Games. It was the nation's largest ever delegation sent to the Olympics, breaking its previous record of 134 athletes set in Beijing 2008.

By May 2015, SASCOC enforced a stringent selection policy to ensure that only world-class athletes would compete for the Olympic team. Specifically, SASCOC would not accept any Olympic places for teams or individual-based athletes, who qualified through African continental routes. For some sports, however, where continental route was the only available path, additional athletes or teams would be applicable for selection.

As a result of SASCOC's selection policy, South Africa permitted to only send football (for both men and women) and men's rugby sevens teams to the Games. For individual-based sports, South Africa marked its Olympic debut in golf (new to the 2016 Games) and equestrian dressage, as well as its return to diving and artistic gymnastics after a near decade of absence.

Track and field accounted for the largest number of athletes on the South African team, with 39 entries. There was a single competitor each in badminton, diving, equestrian, artistic gymnastics, and judo.

Seven of the past Olympic medalists from individual-based sports returned, including defending swimming champions Cameron van der Burgh (men's 100 m breaststroke) and Chad le Clos (men's 200 m butterfly), triple jumper Godfrey Khotso Mokoena, middle-distance runner Caster Semenya (women's 800 m), and flatwater canoeist Bridgitte Hartley. Rowers John Smith and James Thompson, both of whom won gold as members of the former lightweight four crew at London 2012, paired up to take on the men's lightweight double sculls at the Games. Along with Mokoena, javelin thrower Sunette Viljoen joined the exclusive club of South African athletes who competed in four consecutive Olympics, becoming the first female from her country to do so.

18-year-old football midfielder Linda Motlhalo was South Africa's youngest competitor, with sailor Roger Hudson, who raced alongside his London 2012 partner Asenathi Jim in the men's 470 class, rounding out the field as the oldest competitor (aged 38). Other notable South African athletes included world-ranked triathlete Richard Murray, and cancer survivor Lawrence Brittain, together with his veteran partner Shaun Keeling in the men's rowing pair. Track star Wayde van Niekerk, who entered the Games as the reigning world champion and a potential gold medal favorite in the men's 400 metres, led the South African team as the flag bearer in the opening ceremony, the first by a male after 12 years.

| width=78% align=left valign=top |
The following is the list of number of competitors participating in the Games. Note that reserves in fencing, field hockey, football, and handball are not counted as athletes:

Athletics (track and field)

South African athletes have so far achieved qualifying standards in the following athletics events (up to a maximum of 3 athletes in each event):

On 25 May 2016, six marathon runners (three per gender) were named as part of the initial batch of nominated athletes to the Olympic roster for Rio 2016, including London 2012 Olympians Lusapho April and Irvette van Zyl. Following the end of the qualifying period on 11 July, thirty-nine athletes (26 men and 13 women) rounded out the nation's track and field roster for the Games three days later, with triple jumper and Beijing 2008 silver medalist Godfrey Khotso Mokoena leading the team for his fourth straight Olympics.

Track & road events
Men

Women

Field events
Men

Women

Combined events – Men's decathlon

Badminton

Jacob Maliekal qualified for the men's singles into the Olympic tournament. He picked up a continental berth as Africa's top shuttler based on his performance in the BWF World Rankings as of 5 May 2016.

Canoeing

Sprint
Bridgitte Hartley qualified for the Women's K-1 500 metres through the 2015 ICF Canoe Sprint World Championships.

Qualification Legend: FA = Qualify to final (medal); FB = Qualify to final B (non-medal)

Cycling

Road
Four South African riders qualified for the following places in the men's and women's Olympic road race by virtue of their top 4 national ranking in the 2015 UCI Africa Tour (for men) and top 22 in the UCI World Ranking (for women). The men's road cycling team, Daryl Impey and Louis Meintjes, were named as part of the initial batch of nominated athletes to the Olympic roster on 25 May 2016, with the women, Ashleigh Moolman-Pasio and An-Li Kachelhoffer joining them on 14 July. Moolman-Pasio also qualified for the time trial.

Mountain biking
South African mountain bikers, Alan Hatherly and James Reid qualified for the Olympic cross-country race, as a result of the nation's twelfth-place finish in the UCI Olympic Ranking List of 25 May 2016.

BMX
Kyle Dodd qualified for one men's quota place in BMX at the Olympics, as a result of his top three placement for men, not yet qualified, at the 2016 UCI BMX World Championships.

Diving

Julia Vincent qualified by virtue of her top national finish from Africa at the 2015 FINA World Championships.

Equestrian

Dressage rider, Tanya Seymour, qualified for the equestrian competition by virtue of her top national finish from Africa and the Middle East at the FEI qualification event in Perl, Germany.

Dressage

Football

Summary

Men's tournament

South Africa men's football team qualified for the Olympics by winning the third-place playoff of the 2015 U-23 Africa Cup of Nations.

Team roster

Group play

Women's tournament

South Africa women's football team qualified for the Olympics by winning the fourth round play-off of the 2015 CAF Women's Olympic Qualifying Tournament.

Team roster

Group play

Golf

South Africa has entered four golfers (two per gender) into the Olympic tournament. Brandon Stone (world no. 92), Jaco van Zyl (world no. 67), Paula Reto (world no. 122) and Ashleigh Simon (world no. 214) qualified directly among the top 60 eligible players for their respective individual events based on the IGF World Rankings as of 11 July 2016.

Former major winners Louis Oosthuizen and Charl Schwartzel, ranked twelfth and twentieth in the men's world rankings respectively, announced in April 2016 that they would not compete in Rio.

Gymnastics

Artistic
South Africa has entered one artistic gymnast into the Olympic competition for the first time since 2004. Ryan Patterson had claimed his Olympic spot in the men's apparatus and all-around events at the Olympic Test Event in Rio de Janeiro. Moreover, he became the first male South African gymnast to compete at the Games since 1956.

Men

Judo

South Africa has qualified one judoka for the men's middleweight category (90 kg) at the Games. Zack Piontek was directly ranked among the top 22 eligible judokas for men in the IJF World Ranking List of 30 May 2016.

Rowing

South Africa has qualified a total of five boats for each of the following rowing classes into the Olympic regatta. Four rowing crews had confirmed Olympic places for their boats each in the coxless pair and lightweight double sculls (both men and women) at the 2015 FISA World Championships in Lac d'Aiguebelette, France, while the men's four rowers were further added to the South African roster as a result of their top two finish at the 2016 European & Final Qualification Regatta in Lucerne, Switzerland.

The rowing team, led by London 2012 gold medalists John Smith and James Thompson, was named as part of the full nomination of South African athletes for the Games on 14 July 2016.

Men

Women

Qualification Legend: FA=Final A (medal); FB=Final B (non-medal); FC=Final C (non-medal); FD=Final D (non-medal); FE=Final E (non-medal); FF=Final F (non-medal); SA/B=Semifinals A/B; SC/D=Semifinals C/D; SE/F=Semifinals E/F; QF=Quarterfinals; R=Repechage

Rugby sevens

Men's tournament

The South Africa men's rugby sevens team qualified for the Olympics by having achieved one of the top four places at the 2014–15 Sevens World Series.

Team roster

Group play

Quarterfinal

Semifinal

Bronze medal match

Sailing

South African sailors have qualified one boat in each of the following classes through the individual fleet World Championships. The sailing crew was announced as part of the first batch being nominated to the Olympic roster on 25 May 2016.

Men

M = Medal race; EL = Eliminated – did not advance into the medal race

Swimming

A total of 11 male swimmers, led by London 2012 champions Chad le Clos and Cameron van der Burgh, had been selected to the South African roster for the Olympics.  Meanwhile, Michelle Weber entered the  open water race as the squad's sole female and one of the top 10 eligible swimmers at the World Olympic Qualifier in Setubal, Portugal, marking the second time not to send any of the women to the Olympic pool since the post-apartheid era (the first being in 2004).

Men

Women

Triathlon

South Africa has qualified a total of four triathletes for the Olympics. London 2012 Olympian Richard Murray secured the men's triathlon spot with a top three finish at the ITU World Qualification Event in Rio de Janeiro. Meanwhile, Henri Schoeman, Mari Rabie, and Gillian Sanders were ranked among the top 40 eligible triathletes each in the men's and women's event, respectively, based on the ITU Olympic Qualification List as of 15 May 2016.

See also
 South Africa at the 2016 Summer Paralympics

References

External links 

 

Nations at the 2016 Summer Olympics
2016
Olympics